You Amaze Us marks the ninth album from Selah. Curb Records released the project on August 19, 2014. Allan Hall and Todd Smith of Selah produced this album alongside Ed Cash, Jordan Mohilowski, and Jason Kyle.

Reception

Specifying in a four star out of five review for CCM Magazine, Andrew Greer discerns, "Selah's latest is poised to be an extra-distinguished installment in their history-making discography."" Phronsie Howell, agrees it is a four-star album for New Release Tuesday, recognizing, "You Amaze Us is another great release from Selah." Shaving a whole star off his rating compared to the other two from AllMusic, Mark Deming believes, "At once thoughtful and passionate, You Amaze Us is a reminder of why Selah are one of the most celebrated and successful acts in Christian music today." Joshua Andre, awarding the album four stars by 365 Days of Inspiring Media, writes, "each of the three vocalists lead their fair share of tracks quite perfectly and majestically." Rating the album a 4.7 out of five for Christian Music Review, Laura Chambers says, "You Amaze Us details the many ways that God astounds us with His qualities of love, mercy, strength and compassion."

Track listing

Charts

References

2014 albums
Curb Records albums
Selah (band) albums